Joris Frans Borghouts (17 June 1939 – 7 September 2018) was a Dutch Egyptologist. He was Professor of Egyptology at Leiden University from 1985 to 2004.

Career
He obtained his doctorate at Leiden University in 1971 with a dissertation titled: The magical texts of Papyrus Leiden I 348. From 1969 to 1976 he worked as a scientific employee at the Egyptological Seminar of the University of Amsterdam. He returned to Leiden University in 1976.

Borghouts succeeded Jac. J. Janssen as professor and head of the Egyptology department in 1985. Under Borghouts the department reached its maximum size. Around the year 2000 the department became threatened by budget cuts. Borghouts defended the needs of the department and stated that he would see the department become academically irrelevant otherwise. Borghouts retired in 2004. However, he remained attached to Leiden University and The Netherlands Institute for the Near East.

Borghouts was elected a member of the Royal Netherlands Academy of Arts and Sciences in 1999. He died on 7 September 2018.

References

1939 births
2018 deaths
Dutch Egyptologists
Leiden University alumni
Academic staff of Leiden University
Members of the Royal Netherlands Academy of Arts and Sciences
People from Breda